Kapustin Yar is a rural locality (a selo) and the administrative center of Kapustinoyarsky Selsoviet of Akhtubinsky District, Astrakhan Oblast, Russia. The population was 5,724 as of 2010. There are 91 streets.

Geography 
Kapustin Yar is located 46 km northwest of Akhtubinsk (the district's administrative centre) by road. Znamensk is the nearest rural locality.

References 

Rural localities in Akhtubinsky District